Douro Film Harvest is the first totally decentralized  international summit of cinema, that takes place in Alto Douro Wine Region,a area classified by UNESCO as World Heritage Patrimony and homeland of Porto Wine.

Douro Valley receives in September this event allying the winery harvest to the film appreciation

The awards assigned are 
CastaDouro Career, to a person which career had been important to the history of 7th Art
CastaDouro Special Guest
CastaDouro Best Film, to the only section in competition, the Vintage Selection.

This event is organized by Turismo do Douro, with the support of Port and Douro Wine Institute (IVDP), Douro Mission Structure, Turismo de Portugal and production of Expanding World.

Douro Film Harvest 2009 

On its first edition, Douro Film Harvest brought to Portugal the following guests:
 Miloš Forman
 Andie MacDowell
 Kyle Eastwood

In competition, at Vintage Selection, were the following films:
 33 scenes from life by Malgoska Szumowska
 About Elly by Asghar Farhadi
 Alice in Land by Esteban Larrain
 Dawn of the world by Abbas Fahdel
 Don't think about white monkeys by Yuri Mamin
 March by Händl Klaus
 Parque via by Enrique Rivero
 Wolfy by Vasili Sigarev (winner)

Douro Film Harvest 2010 

In 2010, Douro Film Harvest had as guests
 Sophia Loren
 Gustavo Santaolalla
 Carlos Saura

In competition in the Vintage Selection were
 5 x favela, now by ourselves, several directors
 Of Love and other Demons by Hilda Hidalgo
 I, Don Giovanni by Carlos Saura (winner)
 How ended this summer by Alexei Popogrebsky
 Nanga Parbat by Joseph Vilsmaier
 The last flight of flamingo by João Ribeiro
 Solitary Man by David Lean and Brian Koppelman
 South of the Border by Oliver Stone
 The Ghost Writer by Roman Polanski

Douro Film Harvest 2011 

The third edition of Douro Film Harvest will take place between the 5 and 11 September 2011.

External links 
 Douro Film Harvest
 Expanding World
 Turismo do Douro
 Turismo de Portugal
 Porto and Douro Wine Institute (IVDP)
 Douro Mission Structure

Film festivals in Portugal
Recurring events established in 2009
2009 establishments in Portugal
Annual events in Portugal
Autumn events in Portugal